The 1967 Rutgers Scarlet Knights football team represented Rutgers University in the 1967 NCAA University Division football season. In their eighth season under head coach John F. Bateman, the Scarlet Knights compiled a 4–5 record, won the Middle Three Conference championship, and outscored their opponents 212 to 150. The team's statistical leaders included Bruce Van Ness with 504 passing yards, Bryant Mitchell with 542 rushing yards, and Jim Baker with 242 receiving yards.

The Scarlet Knights played their home games at Rutgers Stadium in Piscataway, New Jersey, across the river from the university's main campus in New Brunswick.

Schedule

References

Rutgers
Rutgers Scarlet Knights football seasons
Rutgers Scarlet Knights football